The 2020–21 Slovenian PrvaLiga was the 30th edition of the Slovenian PrvaLiga since its establishment in 1991. The season began on 22 August 2020 and ended on 22 May 2021.

Celje were the defending champions, having won their first title in the previous season. Mura won their first title after defeating Maribor in the final round. As champions, they qualified for the first qualifying round of the 2021–22 UEFA Champions League.

Competition format
Each team played 36 matches (18 home and 18 away). Teams played four matches against each other (2 home and 2 away).

Teams
Rudar Velenje and Triglav Kranj were relegated at the end of the previous season. Koper and Gorica joined the other eight teams in the league this season after gaining promotion from the Slovenian Second League.

Stadiums and locations
Seating capacity only; some stadiums also have standing areas.

Personnel and kits

Managerial changes

League table

Results

First half of the season

Second half of the season

PrvaLiga play-off
A two-legged play-off between the ninth-placed team from the PrvaLiga and the second-placed team from the 2020–21 Slovenian Second League was played. The winner earned a place in the 2021–22 PrvaLiga season.

Koper won 4–3 on aggregate.

Top scorers

See also
2020–21 Slovenian Football Cup
2020–21 Slovenian Second League

Notes
 Many matches were played either behind closed doors or with significantly reduced capacity due to the COVID-19 pandemic in Slovenia.

References

External links
 
Soccerway.com

Slovenian PrvaLiga seasons
Slovenia
1